is a Japanese manga series written and illustrated by Shuhei Miyazaki. It has been serialized in Shueisha's Weekly Shōnen Jump since July 2020. The series is published digitally in English language by Viz Media. An anime television series adaptation by Gallop premiered in December 2022.

Plot
Set in a future where every household owns maid robots known as OrderMaids, average grade-schooler, Bondo Taira, dreams of having his very own robot because of his friends, Gachi Gorilla and Motsuo Kaneo always brag about Kaneo's OrderMaid, Meico. With some convincing, Bondo manages to make his mom agree and get them one, but what he received is an unable to compute maid named Roboco, the most powerful clumsy maid ever created. With Roboco's arrival, Bondo's life starts to get a whole lot weirder.

Characters

A self proclaimed 17 year old order maid who serves Bondo. She has a heavyset body structure and masculine legs. When she has low battery, her body changes to a slim petite girl's.

Bondo is a regular 10 year old boy. He always deals with Roboco's antics, but he tolerates them and he actually feels lonely when she is not around. He is obsessed with Weekly Shōnen Jump.

Gachi Gorilla is one of Bondo's best friends and older brother to his sister Ruri. Gachi Gorilla does not hesitate to help his friends when they are in trouble. When he is not playing with his friends, he is helping his mom to lookout for his siblings.

Motsuo is Bondo's other best friend who also owns a order maid named Meico. He is the richest and smartest among his friends. His father wanted to enroll him in an overseas elementary school, but he refused. Instead, he made a deal with his dad to become the first in every national mock exam in order to stay with his friends until he graduates.

Madoka is 11 year old girl who also works as part time idol. Bondo has a crush on her and is always trying hard to impress her. Madoka has a unique mood swing: she turns masculine whenever she is in serious mode.

Bondo's mother. She is often seen carrying a knife around, even when she does not need it.

Media

Manga
Me & Roboco is written and illustrated by Shuhei Miyazaki. The series began in Shueisha's Weekly Shōnen Jump on July 6, 2020. Shueisha has collected its chapters into individual tankōbon volumes. The first volume (whose cover is a parody of the first Doraemon volume) was released on November 4, 2020. As of December 2, 2022, eleven volumes have been released.

The series is published digitally in English language by Viz Media. In July 2021, Viz Media announced that they would published the volumes digitally; the first volume was released on October 26, 2021.

Volume list

Anime
In May 2022, it was announced that the series will be adapted into an anime television series. The series is produced by Gallop, and directed by Akitaro Daichi, with Michihiro Sato serving as assistant director, Sayuri Ooba overseeing the series' scripts, and Yūko Ebara designing the characters. It premiered on December 5, 2022, on TV Tokyo and its affiliates, and consists of five-minute episodes. The theme song is "lol" by Gang Parade.

Other
In July 2022, a live-action project was announced. It was later revealed to be a collaboration with cosplayer Enako, and a Roboco figure produced by Sentinel Co., Ltd. as part of its Riobot series of figurines.

Reception
Me & Roboco was nominated for the Best Printed Manga category in the 2021 Next Manga Awards and placed 13th out of 50 nominees. The series ranked 11th on the Nationwide Bookstore Employees' Recommended Comics of 2022.

References

External links
 

 

Anime series based on manga
Comedy anime and manga
Fantasy anime and manga
Gallop (studio)
Medialink
Shōnen manga
Shueisha manga
TV Tokyo original programming
Viz Media manga